The Biberman Building is a historic factory located in the Spring Garden neighborhood of Philadelphia.  It was built in 1919–1920, and is a six-story, reinforced concrete building faced in brick and limestone.  It features a Classical Revival-style entrance.  A seventh floor was removed in 1975.  It housed the Biberman Brothers, Co., clothing manufacturers, into the 1970s.

The building was added to the National Register of Historic Places in 2007.

References

Industrial buildings and structures on the National Register of Historic Places in Philadelphia
Neoclassical architecture in Pennsylvania
Industrial buildings completed in 1920
Spring Garden, Philadelphia
Textile mills in the United States